The Ligier JS51 is a sports prototype race car, designed, developed, and built by Ligier, conforming to FIA Group CN regulations, to compete in sports car racing, since 2008.

References 

Sports prototypes
Ligier racing cars